The 2013–14 Colorado State Rams women's basketball team represents Colorado State University in the 2013–14 college basketball season. The Rams, led by second year head coach Ryun Williams. The Rams played their home games at the Moby Arena and were members of the Mountain West Conference. They finish the season 25–8, 15–3 in Mountain West play to win the regular season championship. They advance to the championship game of the Mountain West Conference women's basketball tournament where they lost to Fresno State. As regular season champions who failed to win their conference tournament, they received an automatic big to the Women's National Invitation Tournament where they lost in the first round to Southern Utah.

Roster

Schedule

|-
!colspan=9| Exhibition

|-
!colspan=9| Regular Season

|-
!colspan=9| 2014 Mountain West Conference women's basketball tournament

|-
!colspan=9| 2014 WNIT

See also
2013–14 Colorado State Rams men's basketball team

References 

Colorado State
Colorado State Rams women's basketball seasons
2014 Women's National Invitation Tournament participants
Colorado State Rams
Colorado State Rams